Tiny Mirrors is the first full-length recording by Sandro Perri. It was released in 2007 via Constellation Records.

Critical reception
PopMatters wrote that the album "initially sounds like coffee shop fodder, but reveals itself to be nothing so timid and plain." Exclaim! wrote: "Daring and remarkably coherent, Tiny Mirrors is the prettiest art rock record out of Toronto's underground in years." Pitchfork called the album "tropically tranquil."

Track listing
 "Family Tree" - 3:36
 "City of Museums" - 3:06
 "Double Suicide" - 5:49
 "The Drums" - 3:27
 "Everybody's Talkin'" - 4:50
 "The Mime" - 4:18
 "You're the One" - 4:38
 "White Flag Blues" - 4:43
 "Love Is Real" - 4:30
 "Mirror Tree" - 2:39

References

Sandro Perri albums
2007 albums
Constellation Records (Canada) albums